Ingrid Lafforgue (born 5 November 1948 in Luchon) is a French alpine skier and world champion.

Lafforgue won a gold medal at the 1970 World Championships in Val Gardena, winning the slalom event.

References

External links

1948 births
Living people
French female alpine skiers
People from Saint-Gaudens, Haute-Garonne
FIS Alpine Ski World Cup champions
Sportspeople from Haute-Garonne